Arwon (foaled 8 September 1973, died 25 May 2007) was a New Zealand-bred thoroughbred racehorse by Aritzo from Fair Flash who won the 1978 Melbourne Cup.

In New Zealand, he was known and raced as Flash Guy. Arwon won the 1978 Melbourne Cup, beating Dandeleith and Karu by a half neck. He ran in two more Melbourne Cups, finishing ninth in 1980 to Beldale Ball and fifth in 1981 to Just A Dash.

The name 'Arwon' was made from reversing the word Nowra, a town in New South Wales where one of the syndicate that owned him lived.

Arwon was initially trained by John Morrissey in Canberra before being sent to Victorian trainer George Hanlon, who prepared him for his Melbourne Cup victory, where he was ridden by jockey Harry White. He also won the 1980 Group 2 VATC Sandown Cup, now known as the Sandown Classic, and the 1978 VATC Herbert Power Handicap, both run over 2,400 m. Arwon started in 67 races, won 16 starts, was second 13 times and finished third five times.

He was the Melbourne Cup's oldest living winner until he was euthanized in May 2007 at the age of 33.

Until two years before his death, he took part in the annual Melbourne Cup Parade down Swanston Street, held on Cup Eve (Monday).

Pedigree

References

 Arwon's pedigree and partial racing stats

External links
Horse Racing - Arwon lives on in heart
Victoria Racing Club list of Melbourne Cup Winners
The 1978 Caulfield Cup finish
Obituary

1973 racehorse births
2007 racehorse deaths
Racehorses bred in New Zealand
Racehorses trained in Australia
Melbourne Cup winners
Thoroughbred family 4-c